Anne O'Neal (born Patsy Ann Epperson; December 23, 1893 – November 24, 1971) was an American actress. She appeared in many films portraying matronly landladies, for example.

On television, in 1957, she appeared on Gunsmoke as “Sabina Peavy”, a woman who ends up killing her abusive husband in the episode “Last Fling” (S2E26).

Partial filmography

Strange Wives (1934)
Bad Boy (1935)
The Captain's Kid (1936)
Stand-In (1937)
Of Human Hearts (1938)
The Adventures of Huckleberry Finn (1939)
The Monster and the Girl (1941)
Mr. District Attorney (1941)
Blossoms in the Dust (1941)
Sis Hopkins (1941)
H. M. Pulham, Esq. (1941)
Dr. Kildare's Victory (1942)
In Old California (1942)
Henry and Dizzy (1942)
The Postman Didn't Ring (1942)
The Magnificent Ambersons (1942)
The Sombrero Kid (1942)
The Man in the Trunk (1942)
The Great Gildersleeve (1942)
Henry Aldrich Gets Glamour (1943)
Mexican Spitfire's Blessed Event (1943)
Young Ideas (1943)
I Dood It (1943)
Swing Fever (1943)
The Falcon and the Co-eds (1943)
In Old Oklahoma (1943)
Wilson (1944)
Strangers in the Night (1944)
Pillow to Post (1945)
Three's a Crowd (1945)
The Missing Corpse (1945)
Lover Come Back (1946)
Swell Guy (1946)
The Fabulous Dorseys (1947)
Miracle on 34th Street (1947)
Cheyenne (1947)
The Bishop's Wife (1947)
Open Secret (1948)
On Our Merry Way (1948)
Black Bart (1948)
Sitting Pretty (1948)
Fighting Father Dunne (1948)
Borrowed Trouble (1948)
Good Sam (1948)
The Snake Pit (1948)
The Lone Ranger (TV series) episode 1/15 "Old Joe's Sister" (1949) as Abby.
Adventure in Baltimore (1949)
Lust for Gold (1949)
The Sickle or the Cross (1949)
Bride for Sale (1949)
Gun Crazy (1950)
Blonde Dynamite (1950)
Belle of Old Mexico (1950)
Annie Get Your Gun (1950)
Armored Car Robbery (1950)
Never a Dull Moment (1950)
Ma and Pa Kettle Back on the Farm (1951)
Wells Fargo Gunmaster (1951)
Runaway Daughters (1956)
The Rise and Fall of Legs Diamond (1960), among others.

References

External links

 
 

1893 births
1971 deaths
20th-century American actresses
American film actresses